Christos Albanis (born 8 February 1999) is a Greek professional footballer who plays as a winger for Super League 2 club Panathinaikos B.

References

1999 births
Living people
Greek footballers
Greece youth international footballers
Super League Greece players
Super League Greece 2 players
Asteras Tripolis F.C. players
A.E. Karaiskakis F.C. players
Trikala F.C. players
Levadiakos F.C. players
Panathinaikos F.C. B players
Association football wingers
Footballers from Livadeia